John Joseph Bell (born January 29, 1963) is an American politician and a retired United States Air Force officer. A Democrat, he currently serves in the Virginia Senate by representing the 13th district. From 2016 to 2020 he served as a member of the Virginia House of Delegates, representing the 87th District. Both districts are located in Loudoun County and Prince William County.

Career 
Bell served in the United States Air Force from 1981 to 2007, working as a finance officer and retiring as a Major.

From 2016 to 2020, Bell represented the 87th District in the Virginia House of Delegates.

In August 2018, Bell announced he would run in 2019 for Virginia State Senate District 13, then represented by Republican Dick Black. Bell's announcement came with endorsements from 14 elected Democrats in Virginia, including state Attorney General Mark Herring, House of Delegates Minority Leader David Toscano, and state senator Jennifer Wexton, who was subsequently elected to U.S. Congress.

Bell won the election in November 2019, defeating Republican Loudoun County supervisor Geary Higgins in the general election.

Personal life
Bell is married to wife Margaret, who is a local realtor. They have five children and three grandchildren.

References

1963 births
Living people
Democratic Party Virginia state senators
Democratic Party members of the Virginia House of Delegates
Regis University alumni
George Washington University alumni
People from Loudoun County, Virginia
21st-century American politicians
United States Air Force officers
Western New England University alumni